Portuguese euro coins show three different designs for each of the three series of coins. However, they are quite similar in that all contain old Portuguese royal mints and seals within a circle of seven castles and five escutcheons with silver bezants (all similar to what can be seen in the coat of arms and flag of Portugal) and the word "Portugal". Also featured in the designs, all done by Vítor Manuel Fernandes dos Santos, are the 12 stars of the EU and the year of minting.

Portuguese euro design

Circulating Mintage quantities

Identifying marks

€2 commemorative coins

References

External links
European Central Bank – Portugal

Euro coins by issuing country
Euro coins
Euro